Asfand Yar Khan Kakar is an ethnic Pashtun tribesmen, is a Member of the Provincial Assembly of Balochistan, Pakistan, native of Tehsil Barshore of  District Pishin, and Head of Kakar Tribe. His affiliation is with Pakistan Peoples Party and Minister for Food within its provincial cabinet.

References

Living people
Balochistan MPAs 2008–2013
Pakistan People's Party politicians
Politicians from Balochistan, Pakistan
Pashtun people
People from Pishin District
Year of birth missing (living people)